Pharaoh's Daughter is a world music band from New York.

Pharaoh's Daughter may also refer to:

Pharaoh's daughter (Exodus), who found the baby Moses in the Nile in the book of Exodus
Pharaoh's daughter (wife of Solomon), a figure from the Hebrew Scriptures
The Pharaoh's Daughter, a classical ballet choreographed by Marius Petipa
Pharaoh's Daughter, a collection of poetry by Nuala Ní Dhomhnaill published in 1990
"Pharaoh's Daughter", a song by The Secret Machines from their album Now Here Is Nowhere